Zhao Liang (born 1971) is a Chinese documentary film director and artist.

Life and career
Zhao was born in Liaoning, and graduated from Luxun Academy of Fine Arts in 1992. He supported himself as a photographer while working on his early documentaries. Zhao's 2009 documentary Petition: The Court of the Complainants premiered at the Cannes Film Festival and is about aspects of the legal system in China. The film was shot over twelve years and details the plight of Chinese citizens traveling to Beijing to file complaints with the central government about local officials. His work focuses on global issues and contemporary art.

Filmography
Behemoth (2015)
Together (2010)
Petition (2009)
Return to the Border (2005)

References

External links

Zhao Liang  via dGenerate Films
Filming China's Dark Side: Zhao Liang's films, which explore the relationship between the Chinese government and its citizens, have received critical acclaim abroad, but are not screened in China. NYTimes video by Jonah M. Kessel.
"Documentary filmmaker and photographer Zhao Liang: 'My language is imagery'" Goethe-Institut China (English)

Living people
1971 births
Film directors from Liaoning
Chinese documentary film directors
Chinese film directors